"Miracles" is a song by English synth-pop duo Pet Shop Boys from their greatest hits album, PopArt: The Hits (2003). It was released on 17 November 2003 as the album's lead single. The song was co-written by drum and bass musicians Adam F and Fresh. "Miracles" achieved moderate airplay on the radio and peaked at number 10 on the UK Singles Chart.

Orchestration was conducted by Anne Dudley, who would later work on Pet Shop Boys' 2006 album Fundamental alongside past musical collaborator Trevor Horn.

Remixes were produced by Lemon Jelly and Eric Prydz.

The B-side track "We're the Pet Shop Boys" is a cover of a 2002 song recorded by New York band My Robot Friend, in tribute to the Pet Shop Boys themselves; one part of the lyrics is an extended sequence of Pet Shop Boys song titles. It was covered again by Robbie Williams, with production by the Pet Shop Boys, on his 2006 album Rudebox.

The music video, directed by Howard Greenhalgh, reportedly cost nearly £100,000. It primarily shows human figures interacting with cascades of water and milk, captured in intricate detail by the slow-motion footage (Greenhalgh also made extensive use of water in the video for "Congo" (1997) by Genesis). The buildings on the background include Calatrava's Gare do Oriente and others from the Nations' Park area in Lisbon.

Track listings
UK CD single 1
"Miracles" – 3:57
"We're the Pet Shop Boys" – 4:39

UK CD single 2
"Miracles" (extended mix) – 5:46
"Miracles" (Lemon Jelly remix) – 6:19
"Transparent" – 3:53

Japanese CD maxi single
"Miracles" (radio edit) – 3:57
"We're the Pet Shop Boys" – 4:39
"Miracles" (Lemon Jelly remix) – 6:19
"Transparent" – 3:53
"Miracles" (Eric Prydz remix) – 7:34
"Miracles" (12″ version) – 5:46

UK 12-inch single
A. "Miracles" (Lemon Jelly remix) – 6:19
B1. "Miracles" (Eric Prydz remix) – 7:34
B2. "Miracles" (extended mix) – 5:46

Charts

References

2003 singles
2003 songs
Music videos directed by Howard Greenhalgh
Parlophone singles
Pet Shop Boys songs
Song recordings produced by DJ Fresh
Songs written by Chris Lowe
Songs written by DJ Fresh
Songs written by Neil Tennant